Peter Watts may refer to:

Sportsmen
Peter Watts (cricketer, born 1938), former English cricketer
Peter Watts (cricketer, born 1947), Malaysian-born former English cricketer

Others
Peter Watts (audio engineer) (born 1960), Audio Designer/ Manufacturer
Peter Watts (author) (born 1958), science fiction writer and marine biologist
Peter Watts (Millennium), fictional character on the 1996–99 American television show Millennium
Peter Watts (musician) (1947-2017), bass guitarist for Mott the Hoople
Peter Watts (road manager) (1946–1976), who worked for Pink Floyd; father of actress Naomi Watts

See also
Peter Watt (born 1969), former General Secretary of the Labour Party in the United Kingdom
Watts (surname)